Niall Grimley is an Irish Gaelic footballer who plays at senior level for the Armagh county team.

On 25 October 2017, Grimley was named in the Ireland squad for the 2017 International Rules Series against Australia in November.

References

Year of birth missing (living people)
Living people
Armagh inter-county Gaelic footballers
Irish international rules football players